The Pyrenean Mountain Dog 
() is a breed of livestock guardian dog from France, where it is commonly called the Patou. The breed comes from the French side of the Pyrenees Mountains that separate France and Spain. It is recognised as a separate breed from the closely related Pyrenean Mastiff, which is from the Spanish side of the mountains.

The breed is widely used throughout France as a livestock guardian, particularly in the French Alps and Pyrenees, protecting flocks from predation by wolves and bears. The breed is known as the Great Pyrenees in the United States, where it is also used to protect flocks from various predators.

History 

The Pyrenean Mountain Dog is a traditional breed of the Pyrenees. In France it is usually called the 'Patou'. It is sometimes claimed that its forebears – and those of the Pyrenean Mastiff – were white livestock guardian dogs brought to the area from Asia in Roman times, and thus that it is related to Maremmano-Abruzzese Sheepdog of Italy and the Kuvasz of Hungary. Genomic data places it within the same genetic clade as the Pharaoh Hound, Cirneco dell'Etna, and the Ibizan Hound.

In the seventeenth century, Madame de Maintenon and Louis, Dauphin of France, brought a dog of this type to the court of King Louis XIV, where they soon became in great demand, the King even naming it the Royal Dog of France. They came to be used by the French nobility to guard their châteaux, particularly in the south of the country. It is sometimes claimed that French settlers brought these dogs with them to Canada and that they are among the forebears of the Newfoundland dog. In the 1830s, Pyrenean Mountain Dogs were used as one of the foundation breeds in the creation of the Leonberger.

With the extirpation of wolves from the Pyrenees, the popularity of the breed declined and by the beginning of the 20th century it was on the verge of extinction. Local shepherds sold pups to eager tourists and it is from these pups the breed found its way to Britain and several were registered with The Kennel Club at the beginning of the century, although British interest in the large breed declined during the First World War. French aristocrat and dog authority Bernard Senac-Lagrange is credited with saving the breed from extinction at the beginning of the 20th century, touring the mountains to collect the finest specimens available to form a breeding base. Senac-Lagrange established the first breed club, the  Réunion des Amateurs de Chiens Pyrénées, and drew up the first breed standard for the breed in 1923; he also registered the breed as the Chien de Montagne des Pyrénées with the Société Centrale Canine in the same year. In 1946 the Real Sociedad Canina de España recognised the large white livestock guardians on the Spanish side of the Pyrenees as the Pyrenean Mastiff with a slightly different breed standard.

In the early 1930s, the Pyrenean Mountain Dog was imported into North America where it is known as the Great Pyrenees. The breed became a favourite in the show ring in both Canada and the United States. In 1935, the American Kennel Club adopted a new breed standard that had a number of deviations from the French original that would not be permitted in France. This standard promoted the exaggeration of certain physical features at the expense of functional form and was later adopted by Britain's Kennel Club. To combat the deterioration of the breed's show lines in their country, in 2011 the British Pyrenean Mountain Dog breed club released a brochure with instructions for show judges not to reward glamorous, heavy-bodied, short-muzzled examples of the breed over lean and muscular examples with weatherproof coats capable of performing their original role in high mountainous regions.

Description

Appearance
The breed's head is not overly large in comparison to the body; it has a long, broad and slightly pointed muzzle with lips that are not pendulous and small triangular ears that hang flat to the head. The breed has a short and strong neck, a broad and moderately deep chest and a long tail that hangs low when the dog is at rest but curls over the dog's back when the dog is roused. A distinctive feature of the breed is that it possesses double dewclaws on the hind legs, the absence of which is considered a disqualifying fault in conformation shows.

The breed has a long and thick double coat that provides it protection from harsh weather; the long and flat outer coat is particularly long around the neck, tail and backs of the legs, and it has a fine and thick under coat. The breed is predominantly white in colour, with patches of black, badger, grey or various shades of tan found mostly on the head; badger is defined as a mixture of brown, black, grey and white hairs and is commonly seen in puppies but usually fades as the dog ages. Whilst purebred examples of the breed with black patches are seen in litters, such colouration is considered a fault by show dog fanciers and is not permitted in conformation shows.

Behavior 
The Pyrenean Mountain Dog is known for its independence and protective nature, attractive qualities for farmers who want to protect their livestock.  This breed is also quite popular for large households not only due to its large size but also because of its keen ability to protect all members of a family as well as being particularly affectionate towards children ; though it is also known to be wary towards strangers. The Great Pyrenees stands out as one of the more intelligent breeds, however can be difficult to train due to its independent personality. Furthermore, due to its large size, training is necessary at an early age or else it can become physically demanding to establish obedience later.

Use 

For millennia these dogs were used by shepherds throughout the Pyrenean region to protect their flocks from predation by wolves and bears; in this rôle they were usually fitted with a heavy iron wolf collar studded with long nails for protection when fighting off wolves. They were often used by shepherds in combination with the much smaller Pyrenean Sheepdog, the former guarding the flocks and the latter herding them. They were also used to smuggle contraband between France and Spain, carrying packs over the Pyrenees on routes impassable to humans to avoid detection by customs officials.

The Pyrenean Mountain Dog is today used in its original role as a livestock guardian for French shepherds in the French Pyrenees and the French Alps, as well as in the United States.

France
In the early 1980s farmers in the Massif Central and Lozère were experiencing problems with stray dogs attacking their flocks, so the French ITOVIC commenced an experiment with around 15 Pyrenean Mountain Dogs given to farmers. By the late 1980s the ITOVIC experiment had been completed and an association, APAP, had been formed with around 15 Pyrenean Mountain Dog breeders, with the objective of providing suitable livestock guardian dogs to potential farmers, and by 1991 around 100 dogs were working on farms.

In the early 1990s Italian wolves began to cross from Italy into France, where they have become established in approximately one third of its continental territories, particularly in the French Alps and Provence, but also throughout the Massif Central. Even before the presence of wolves was publicly reported in France, some farmers around the Mercantour National Park had reported unusual stock predation, which was, at the time, attributed by authorities to uncontrolled domestic dogs. Wolves are protected in France; in order to protect the livelihoods of farmers from wolf predation, since the late 1990s, the French government has subsidized various methods of protecting flocks from depredation, including electrified pasture fencing, secured electrified night pens, hiring of additional farm hands, and the purchase, training and upkeep of livestock guardian dogs. After the extirpation of wolves from France in the 1800s, livestock guardian dogs had been absent from the French Alps for over a century; when wolves resettled the country in the 1990s, the French Pyrenean Mountain Dog was the breed selected for use, as the ITOVIC trials had already been conducted with the breed, and within the country, the APAP was breeding Pyrenean Mountain Dogs specifically for the purpose.

In the mid-1990s the French government began importing European brown bears from Slovenia into the Pyrenees, in order to save the species from extirpation from the region by genetic inbreeding, as the local population had been reduced to an estimated six bears. With the increased numbers of bears in the region, local shepherds reported increases of stock losses to bear predation, particularly in the summer months, when shepherds move their flocks into the mountains to graze the summer alpine pastures. To assist the shepherds, government funding was provided to implement the same protection measures as those employed for wolves, and Pyrenean Mountain Dogs were given to farmers in the Pyrenees to guard flocks from predators. Studies conducted in the mid-2000s found shepherds who employed Pyrenean Mountain Dogs across the Pyrenees reported 90% fewer stock losses to predators than shepherds who did not employ the dogs. The re-employment of Pyrenean Mountain Dogs within the Pyrenees has not been without issues, with reports of hikers traversing the mountains being attacked by the livestock guardians protecting their flocks, leading to a bilingual pamphlet being produced to warn walkers and bikers against risky behaviours in order to decrease incidents.

In 2009 there were over 1000 Pyrenean Mountain Dogs being used to protect flocks against wolves in the Alps, and 500 protecting flocks in the Pyrenees. In 2019, French government funding was being provided for the upkeep of 4258 livestock guardian dogs throughout the country, 92% of which were in the French Alps and Provence, although it is estimated the total number of dogs being employed at the time was around 5000.

United States
Beginning in the late 1970s, sheep farmers in the United States began employing livestock guardian dogs to protect their flocks from  various predators, particularly coyotes and black bears, but also cougars and grizzly bears. Several factors influenced the move to integrate livestock guardian dogs into farming operations, including federal restrictions on the use of poisons to control predator numbers. A 1986 survey of over 400 farmers employing 763 livestock guardian dogs in the United States found 57% of them used Pyrenean Mountain Dogs, with Komondors, Akbashs, Anatolians and Maremmano-Abruzzese Sheepdogs being employed in fewer numbers.

Notes

References

External links

 Réunion des Amateurs de Chiens Pyrénées website 

Dog breeds originating in France
FCI breeds
Livestock guardian dogs